Jeff or Jeffrey Webb may refer to:
 Jeff Webb (gridiron football), American gridiron football wide receiver
 Jeff Webb (basketball), American basketball player
 Jeff Webb (entrepreneur),American entrepreneur and business executive
 Jeffrey Webb (football executive), former president of CONCACAF, Cayman Islands Football Association, and FIFA vice president
 Jeffrey Webb (skier), Malaysian alpine ski racer

See also
 Geoffrey Webb (disambiguation)